The 2021–22 North West Counties Football League season was the 40th in the history of the North West Counties Football League, a football competition in England, and the fourth season following the split of the lower level into two geographically separated divisions. Teams are divided into three divisions: Premier Division, at Step 5, and Divisions One North and South, at Step 6.

The allocations for Steps 5 and 6 this season were announced by The Football Association on 18 May 2021, and were subject to appeal. On 8 April, it was announced at the league's Management Committee meeting that the season would start no earlier than Saturday 31 July. The league constitution was adopted on 12 June.

After the abandonment of the 2019–20 and 2020–21 seasons due to the COVID-19 pandemic in England, numerous promotions were decided on a points per game basis over the previous two seasons.

Premier Division

The Premier Division comprises 21 teams, 15 of which competed in the previous season's aborted competition. 

The following five clubs left the Premier Division before the season:
 1874 Northwich – promoted to the Northern Premier League
 Bootle – promoted to the Northern Premier League
 Hanley Town – transferred to the Midland League
 Warrington Rylands – promoted to the Northern Premier League
 Whitchurch Alport – transferred to the Midland League

The following six clubs joined the Premier Division before the season:
 AFC Liverpool – promoted from Division One North
 Lower Breck – promoted from Division One North
 Macclesfield – a newly formed phoenix club
 Prestwich Heys – promoted from Division One North
 Vauxhall Motors – promoted from Division One South
 Wythenshawe Town – promoted from Division One South

Congleton Town's initial transfer laterally to the Midland League was successfully appealed and this move was reversed.

Premier Division table

Inter-step play-offs

Stadia and locations

Division One North

Division One North comprises 19 clubs, 16 of which were in the division the previous season.

The following four clubs left Division One North before the season, three promoted to the Premier Division:
 AFC Liverpool
 Lower Breck
 Prestwich Heys
 Shelley Community – resigned

The following three clubs joined Division One North before the season:
 Campion – transferred from the Northern Counties East League
 Ilkley Town – promoted from the West Yorkshire League
 South Liverpool – promoted from the West Cheshire League

FC Isle of Man appealed for a move to Division One South for logistical reasons after the initial allocation to this division and the club's request was granted.

Division One North table

Stadia and locations

Division One South

Division One South comprises 20 clubs, 16 of which were in the division the previous season.

The following three clubs left Division One South before the season:
 Stone Old Alleynians – promoted to the Midland League
 Vauxhall Motors – promoted to the Premier Division
 Wythenshawe Town – promoted to the Premier Division

The following four clubs joined Division One South before the season, three transferred from the Midland League:
 Brocton
 Rocester
 Stafford Town

Wem Town, previously allocated from the West Midlands (Regional) League, resigned from this league. To fill the vacancy, FC Isle of Man, returning from membership suspension for the rest of last season and initially assigned to Division One North, requested for a transfer to this division and the FA granted it.

Division One South table

Stadia and locations

References

External links 
 The Official Website of The North West Counties League

North West Counties Football League seasons
9